Konstantin Päts' first cabinet was in office in Estonia from 25 January 1921 to 21 November 1922, when it was succeeded by Juhan Kukk's cabinet.

Members

This cabinet's members were the following:

References

Cabinets of Estonia